Bosquito (Pronunciation: ʙᴏsᴋɪːᴛᴏ) is a Romanian rock band formed in Brașov in the year 1999. The group's current line-up consists of vocalist/guitarist Radu Almășan, drummer Dorin Țapu, guitarist Ciprian Pascal, bassist Mircea “Burete” Preda. The band is well known for infusing their songs with diverse influences, including Gypsy music, Latin, balkan, punk, and elements of symphonic music. The group has released 5 albums to date with several top-charting singles including "Pepita", "Marcela", "Bosquito", "Hopa Hopa", and the ballad "Două Mâini", which reached #1 in the Romanian Top 100  and remains one of the most celebrated love songs in Romanian music. In 2005, the band entered a hiatus on the Romanian market while relocating to the United States; the original line-up disbanded shortly thereafter. In 2011 Radu Almășan made a comeback as Bosquito with a brand-new lineup  launching their first single in 6 years: "Când Îngerii Pleacă", and releasing a new album, Babylon in 2014.

History

Early days and debut album, Bosquito (1999-2001)
Bosquito was formed in Brașov at the initiative of singer Radu Almășan, who dropped out of college in his freshman year to completely dedicate himself to the new band. The first lineup consisted of Victor "Solo" Solomon on guitar, Victor "Vichi" Stephanovici on bass, Mișu Constantinescu on keyboards, and Darius Neagu on drums. Their first demo, containing an early version of the song "Spune Da!" (a song that would later be included on their self-titled debut album), was pitched to MediaPro Music.

The label requested a second demo, which included an early version of "Pas cu Pas", a song that would go on to become their first single and music video. By May 2000, Bosquito played their first show at the Propaganda Pro FM festival, the biggest concert in Romania at the time. They were subsequently signed to Mediapro Music. Their self-titled debut album was recorded in Bucharest and released on September 1, 2000.

Two singles were released from this album: "Pas cu Pas", released concomitantly with the album on September 1, and "Țigano" released in Spring 2001. The singles propelled Bosquito into the Romanian touring circuit, with rotation on music television channels, but not on radio. The band became a live phenomenon, increasing their fanbase through extensive touring. Numerous Romanian music publications regarded the band as the best new live act of 2001. The song "Pas cu Pas" was included on Mediapro's "A Fost Vara Ispitelor", a compilation of that year's best songs.

Sar Scântei and Cocktail Molotov (2001-2003)
Following the positive reaction of the self-titled debut album, Bosquito began working on new material in the summer of 2001. They recorded and filmed the music video for their next single "Pepita", a Mexican-folk cover with Romanian lyrics that Radu would sing during his childhood. The song was their first radio hit and the rotation of the music video on ProTV would make the band popular all over Romania. Pepita was to be included on the band's next album Sar Scântei, released on June 9, 2002.
 
The album spawned two more singles, accompanied by music videos, that were released to popular and critical acclaim. First the balkanic-influenced "Hopa Hopa" followed by "Doua Mâini", a love song that would represent Bosquito's commercial peak to date. Doua Mâini became #1 on the Romanian Top 100, has since become a staple for the band's live performances, and remains one of the most celebrated Romanian love songs. By 2003, the band began considering an international career with a move to the United States. Under these circumstances, drummer Darius Neagu would decide to leave the band, being replaced by Radu Buzac. Due to their dissatisfaction regarding the audio quality of a few songs on the debut album, the band decided to re-record some of them, plus 3 bonus covers ("Patience" by Guns N' Roses, "Gitano" by Santana — renamed "Gosa Como Yo" for the album, and "Soldier Of Fortune" by Deep Purple).

Bosquito recorded their first song in English "Running From You" and decided to release a compilation that included the re-recorded songs, the covers, and the new song. The compilation was named Cocktail Molotov and was released in October 2003. The single from this album "Bosquito" got significant airplay on national radio & TV stations. A few weeks before the album's release the band suffered another line-up change, with Radu Buzac being replaced by Andrei Cebotari. In a later interview for Formula AS, lead singer Radu Almășan stated that the band would rather have a rock drummer than a jazz-trained one such as Buzac.

The band felt that Andrei Cebotari, former drummer of Zdob Si Zdub, integrated much better with its musical direction. At this time, the group decided to also include long-time collaborator, percussionist Mario Apostol, as an official member. In February 2003, in a ceremony held at "Teatrul Sică Alexandrescu" in Brașov, Bosquito received the "Brașoveanul Anului (a city-wide "Person of the year") award by vote of the readers of "Monitorul Expres". They were given the award by the then-vice mayor (future mayor) of Brașov: George Scripcaru. Bosquito ended the ceremony with a concert.

Fărâme Din Soare (2004-2005)
Following numerous concerts in the previous year, the band decided to take a break from touring and rented a cabin in the mountains where they would spend the month of January 2004, solely focusing on writing for the next album. Upon returning and discovering that MediaPro's managerial staff had been completely changed by the owners and feeling insecure with the label's new direction, Bosquito decided to leave MediaPro and signed a new record deal with Cat Music / Media Services. In Spring 2004, Radu Almășan, the band's main composer, signed the band's catalogue to EMI Publishing. Subsequently, the band started recording the new album in Bucharest, and decided to title it Fărâme Din Soare.

The album was released in August 2004, with the first single "Marcela" being a bold change of style, including elements of punk. The song was largely ignored by the majority of radio stations but became a fan favorite and live staple. The next single and music video  was "Tu Ești Iubita Mea", a song that would have considerably greater airplay. The band continued to tour extensively, being voted by music lovers of Romania as being the "Best Live Act" of 2004.

America, rift and dissension between members (2005-2010)
In the beginning of 2005, after years of preparation, the band decides to relocate to the United States. Following that, Mario Apostol and Mișu Constantinescu part with the band. Being for the first time a four-piece, the band flies to Los Angeles on March 16. Two days before their departure, the remaining members shot a music video for "Dupa Furtuna", a single only afterwards. In Los Angeles, they decided to perform under the pseudonym "Acoustic Bullet" upon being advised that the name "Bosquito" might be less suited for the American audience.

They started touring clubs in the Los Angeles area such as The Viper Room, The Hard Rock Cafe, The Knitting Factory, and the House Of Blues. Shortly after recording a demo in English, tensions between members began to rise leading Victor Solomon and Vichi Stephanovici to return to Romania and leave the band. Radu Almășan and Andrei Cebotari would decide to carry on in America.

However, due to visa limitations, they would return to Romania for the summer of 2005 touring with Victor Solomon and bassist Adrian Ciuplea as collaborators. In December 2005, Radu and Andrei left again in order to concentrate on their newly formed indie rock band Madame Hooligan, leaving Bosquito in an indefinite hiatus in Romania, but continuing sporadic concerts under several temporary lineups in America.

Return to Romania with new line-up  (2010-2014) 
In 2010, Radu Almășan visited Romania for the first time in 5 years. During this time he responded to an invitation to appear on ProTV's Happy Hour talk show, and, instead of showcasing old material as requested by the producers, wrote a new song "Tobogan" for the occasion. Radu, accompanied by percussionist Felix Mircea Moldovan, premiered "Tobogan" during the show on June 30. Due to the overwhelmingly positive response to the song, and contractual obligations for Madame Hooligan which would keep him performing in Romania for the next two years, Radu decided to reform Bosquito in a different line-up and make a comeback for the Romanian audience.

At this time, longtime partner Andrei Cebotari opted to return to Moldova for family reasons, eventually rejoining with his former band Zdob Si Zdub. In August, Radu Almășan signed a new, three-year record deal with Roton. Upon deciding to give a shot to younger collaborators, Radu started performing with Ciprian Pascal on guitar, Dorin Țapu on bass, and Felix Mircea Moldovan on drums. Their first concert as Bosquito took place in Piatra Neamț, on November 5, 2010. Due to touring with Madame Hooligan in the first part of 2011, Bosquito started regularly performing and preparing a comeback single only in the last part of that year. A notable exception is their Bucharest concert at Piața Constituției opening for Shakira in front of 20,000 people for The Sun Comes Out World Tour.

The song "Când Îngerii Pleacă was recorded with Dorin Țapu switching to drums, and Austin Jesse Mitchell from Madame Hooligan playing bass. This situation, initially seen as a compromise for Felix Mircea Moldovan's prior engagements and inability to attend the sessions, led finally to Pascal, Țapu, and Mitchell being included in the band as official members. The band premiered their new song live with a special concert at "Garajul EuropaFM" on August 4, 2011. Following a positive response from fans and press, a music video was filmed and the song officially debuted on radio EuropaFM on November 16. A period of touring followed in order to present the new songs and line-up to the fans.

In the beginning of 2012, Bosquito started to collaborate with the legendary drummer Ovidiu Lipan Ţăndărică, of Phoenix fame. This resulted in a new single and music video, "Întuneric în Culori", as well as nationwide concerts featuring both artists following the single's release in August. As of summer 2012, the band has begun recording its first album since 2004. In December 2012, MTV featured Bosquito in its MTV Unplugged series. Two songs from the upcoming album were premiered on television during the Unplugged concert: "București" and "Omule Perete". The performance also featured Mariano Castro, pianist of Narcotango, former member Mario Apostol and a string quartet.

In autumn of 2013, Bosquito performed a major concert at the historic Cinema Patria in Bucharest to great success, and followed the concert with a summer tour through all of the most popular Black Sea tourist destinations including Jupiter and Vama Veche.

Babylon (2014-present)
In September 2014, Bosquito released an album consisting of the recordings made during their comeback period starting in 2010 along with several new, never-heard-before songs. The album was heavily promoted during the band's 2014 summer tour with the single "Prieteni", and was followed by a major concert held again at the landmark Cinema Patria in Bucharest on November 10, 2014.

Members
Official members:
 Radu Almășan – lead vocals, acoustic guitar, electric guitar
 Ciprian Pascal – electric guitar, acoustic guitar, mandolin, backup vocals
 Mircea “Burete” Preda – bass guitar
 Dorin Țapu – drums, electric guitar, twelve-string guitar

Live band collaborators:
 Mariano Castro – keyboards, piano
 Harvis Padron – trumpet
 Madalina Penciu – viola
 Cristina Pasa – violin
 Diana Jipa – violin
 Violeta Tuta-Popescu – cello
 Gilberto Ortega – percussion

Discography

Studio albums
 2000: Bosquito
 2002: Sar Scântei
 2003: Cocktail Molotov
 2004: Fărâme Din Soare
 2014: Babylon
 2019: Sus

Singles & Music videos

References

External links

 Bosquito's official Facebook website
 Last.fm profile on Bosquito

Romanian rock music groups